The Ahmići massacre was the mass murder of approximately 120 Bosniak civilians by members of the Croatian Defence Council in April 1993, during the Croat–Bosniak War. The massacre was the culmination of the Lašva Valley ethnic cleansing committed by the political and military leadership of the Croatian Community of Herzeg-Bosnia. It was the largest massacre committed during the conflict between Bosnian Croats and the Bosniak-dominated Bosnian government.

The International Criminal Tribunal for the former Yugoslavia in The Hague has ruled that these crimes amounted to crimes against humanity in numerous verdicts against Croat political and military leaders and soldiers, most notably Dario Kordić, the political leader of Croats in Central Bosnia who was sentenced to 25 years in prison. The massacre was discovered by United Nations Peacekeeping troops of the 1st Battalion, Cheshire Regiment, drawn from the British Army, under the command of Colonel Bob Stewart.

Background

Ahmići is a village in central Bosnia and Herzegovina, located in the municipality of Vitez in the Lašva Valley. According to the 1991 census, 1,178 people lived in the village. 509 were Bosniaks, 592 were Croats, 30 were Serbs and 47 classified as "others".

On 3 April 1993, the Bosnian Croat leadership met in Mostar to discuss the implementation of the Vance-Owen plan and decided to implement the creation of "Croatian Provinces" (Provinces 3, 8 and 10) placing the Bosnian armed forces under the command of the General Staff of the Croatian Defence Council (HVO), the military formation of Bosnian Croats.

On 4 April, according to Reuters, the HVO headquarters in Mostar set a deadline for President of Bosnia and Herzegovina Alija Izetbegović to sign the above agreement and stated, "If Izetbegović fails to sign this agreement by 15 April, the HVO will unilaterally enforce its jurisdiction in cantons three, eight and ten". In a message from HVO leaders Dario Kordić, Ignac Koštroman and Anto Valenta, Croats were instructed to display more Croatian flags on buildings.

An organised attack
On Friday, 16 April 1993 at 05:30, Croatian forces simultaneously attacked Vitez, Stari Vitez, Ahmići, Nadioci, Šantici, Pirići, Novaci, Putiš and Donja Večeriska. HVO General Tihomir Blaškić spoke of 20 to 22 sites of simultaneous combat all along the road linking Vitez, Travnik, and Busovača. The ICTY Trial Chamber found that this was a planned attack against the Bosniak civilian population. The attack was preceded by several political declarations announcing that a conflict between Croatian forces and Bosnian forces was imminent. On the day of the attack, telephone lines had been cut because all communication exchanges in the municipality of Vitez were under HVO control.

Croat inhabitants of those villages were warned of the attack and some of them were involved in preparing it. Croat women and children had been evacuated on the eve of the fighting. The method of attack displayed a high level of preparation. The attacks in the built-up areas, such as those carried out in the Ahmići area were operations planned in minute detail with the aim of killing or driving out the Bosniak population, resulting in a massacre. On the evening of 15 April, unusual HVO troop movements had been noticed.

On the morning of 16 April, the main roads were blocked by Croat troops. According to several international observers, the attack occurred from three sides and was designed to force the fleeing population towards the south where elite marksmen with particularly sophisticated weapons shot those escaping. Other troops, organised in small groups of about five to ten soldiers, went from house to house setting them on fire and killing the residents. Around one hundred soldiers took part in the operation. The attack resulted in the massacre of the Bosniak villagers and the destruction of the village. Among the more than 100 who died were 32 women and 11 children under the age of 18. The aim of the HVO artillery was to support the infantry and destroy structures which the infantry could not. The mosque, for example, was hit by a shot from a powerful weapon. Later the minaret was blown up by Bralo and Jukić.

Murders of civilians
Overall, 117 to 120 Bosniaks were killed in the massacre. Most of the men were shot at point blank range. Some men had been rounded up and then killed by Croatian soldiers. Twenty or so civilians were also killed in Donji Ahmići as they tried to flee the village. The fleeing inhabitants had to cross an open field before getting to the main road. About twenty bodies of people killed by very precise shots were found in the field. Military experts concluded that they had been shot by marksmen. Other bodies were found in the houses so badly charred they could not be identified and in positions suggesting they had been burned alive. The victims included many women and children.

A European Community Monitor Mission observer said he had seen the bodies of children who, from their position, seemed to have died in agony in the flames: "some of the houses were absolute scenes of horror, because not only were the people dead, but there were those who were burned and obviously some had been burned with flame launchers, which had charred the bodies and this was the case of several of the bodies". According to the ECMM report, at least 103 people were killed during the attack on Ahmići.

Destruction of property

According to the Centre for Human Rights in Zenica, 180 of the existing 200 Bosniak houses in Ahmići were burned during the attack. The Commission on Human Rights made the same finding in its report dated 19 May 1993. According to the ECMM practically all the Bosnian Muslim houses in the villages of Ahmići, Nadioci, Pirići, Sivrino Selo, Gaćice, Gomionica, Gromiljak and Rotilj had been burned. According to ECMM observer "it was a whole area that was burning". Several religious buildings were destroyed. Two mosques were deliberately mined and given the careful placement of the explosives inside the buildings. Furthermore, the mosque in Donji Ahmići was destroyed by explosives laid around the base of its minaret.

The troops involved
The troops involved in the attack included the Military Police Fourth Battalion and, in particular, the Džokeri Unit. The Džokeri (Jokers), an anti-terrorist squad with twenty or so members, were created in January 1993 from within the Military Police on the order of Zvonko Voković, whose mission was to carry out special assignments such as sabotage, stationed at the bungalow in Nadioci. Other participants included the Vitezovi, the Viteška brigade of the municipality of Vitez, the Nikola Šubić Zrinski brigade of Busovača, together with Domobrani units (units set up in each village in accordance with a decision from Mostar dated 8 February 1993) stationed at Ahmići, Šantići, Pirići and Nadioci. Many witnesses in the Blaškić case also referred to soldiers in camouflage uniforms being present, wearing the emblem of the HVO. Several Croat inhabitants of these villages also participated in the attack. They were members of the Domobrani such as Slavko Miličević for the Donji Ahmići sector, Žarko Papić for the Zume area, Branko Perković in Nadioci, Zoran Kupreškić in Grabovi (an area in the centre of Ahmići), Nenad Šantić and Colic in Šantići.

Trial
The International Criminal Tribunal for the former Yugoslavia (ICTY) in the Hague has ruled that these crimes amounted to crimes against humanity in numerous verdicts against Croat political and military leaders and soldiers, most notably Dario Kordić, political leader of Croats in Central Bosnia who was sentenced to 25 years in prison. Based on the evidence of numerous HVO attacks at that time, the ICTY Trial Chamber concluded in the Kordić and Čerkez case that by April 1993 Croat leadership had a common design or plan conceived and executed to ethnically cleanse Bosniaks from the Lašva Valley. Dario Kordić, as the local political leader, was found to be the planner and instigator of this plan.

Further concluding that the Croatian Army was involved in the campaign, the ICTY defined the events as an international conflict between Bosnia and Herzegovina and Croatia.

Former Croatian president Stjepan Mesić revealed thousands of documents and audio tapes recorded by Franjo Tuđman about his plans during a case against Croat leaders from Bosnia and Herzegovina for war crimes committed against Bosniaks. During the trial against Tihomir Blaškić, who was the HVO commander for the Central Bosnian Operative Zone, for the crimes in Ahmići, the defence argued that there was a parallel line of command surpassing Blaškić that went to the political leadership of Herzeg-Bosnia. There were reports in the media that Tuđman himself participated in the coverup. The appeals chamber of the ICTY ruled that Blaškić did not have command responsibility for the massacre and lowered the initial sentence (in 2000) of 45 years to nine years of imprisonment. He was released after serving 8 years and 4 months of his sentence.

The ICTY initially indicted sixteen Croats and convicted eight of them by now of their roles in the Lašva Valley ethnic cleansing. Ignac Koštroman and Anto Valenta were never charged by the ICTY.

Tribute

Croatia's president Ivo Josipović alongside Islamic and Catholic religious leaders paid tribute on 15 April 2010 to victims in Ahmići and Križančevo selo.

See also
List of massacres in Bosnia and Herzegovina

Notes

References

Books

Other

External links
SENSE Center: Ahmići - 48 hours of ashes and blood
The UN indictment of the perpetrators
Photographs of the village after the attack
ICTY: Initial indictment for the ethnic cleansing of the Lasva Valley area – Part I
ICTY: Initial indictment for the ethnic cleansing of the Lasva Valley area – Part II
ICTY: Kordić and Čerkez verdict
ICTY: Blaškić verdict
HRW: Conflict between Bosnia and Herzegovina and Croatia

Related films
 
  – Part III. The Struggle for Bosnia

Massacres in the Bosnian War
Massacres of Bosniaks
Croatian war crimes in the Bosnian War
1993 in Bosnia and Herzegovina
Massacres in 1993
April 1993 events in Europe
Conflicts in 1993